Adolf II, Prince of Schaumburg-Lippe (23 February 1883 – 26 March 1936) was the last ruler of the small Principality of Schaumburg-Lippe.

Biography

Adolf was born in Stadthagen to the then hereditary Prince Georg (1846–1911) and Princess Marie Anne of Saxe-Altenburg (1864–1918) during the reign of his grandfather Prince Adolf I.

He became heir apparent to Schaumburg-Lippe on 8 May 1893 following the death of his grandfather, and the accession of his father. He succeeded his father as prince on 29 April 1911, and reigned until he was forced to abdicate on 15 November 1918 following the German revolution: the principality became the Free State of Schaumburg-Lippe. Adolf was exiled to Brioni in Istria.

During his reign he developed the spa of Bad Eilsen and was responsible for many buildings there.

Marriage and death

Adolf married Ellen Bischoff-Korthaus (1894–1936, previously married to Prince Eberwyn, son of Alexis, Prince of Bentheim and Steinfurt) in Berlin on 10 January 1920.

They were both killed in a plane crash in  Zumpango, Mexico, on 26 March 1936, while flying from Mexico City to Guatemala City in a Ford Trimotor airplane.

The New York Times from 27 March 1936 reported that it was the worst Mexican air crash. All fourteen people died on board the airplane, ten tourists from Europe and four crew members. His youngest brother Prince Friedrich Christian of Schaumburg-Lippe, who served as an adjutant to Joseph Goebbels, spoke out against letting Ellen be buried in Bückeburger Mausoleum next to her husband, because she was not of "Aryan origin". He was succeeded as head of the House of Schaumburg-Lippe by his brother Wolrad.

Ancestry

References

External links

A 1913 wire photo; hosting and hunting with the Germain kaiser. Quebec Chronicle

1883 births
1936 deaths
People from Stadthagen
Princes of Schaumburg-Lippe
House of Lippe
Victims of aviation accidents or incidents in Mexico
Victims of aviation accidents or incidents in 1936
State leaders killed in aviation accidents or incidents
People from Schaumburg-Lippe
Grand Crosses of the Order of Saint Stephen of Hungary